Meltrix Gerome Williams (born July 9, 1973) is a former American football defensive back. He played for the San Diego Chargers from 1997 to 1998.

References

1973 births
Living people
American football defensive backs
Houston Cougars football players
San Diego Chargers players